Qemal Stafa (20 March 1920 – 5 May 1942) was a founding member of the Albanian Communist Party, and the leader of its youth section.

Biography
Stafa was born in Elbasan in 1920, in a family originating from the Zabzun village, at the time part of Dibra Region. His father Ahmet was in the military, and moved in 1923 to Shkodër as Director of the Recruiting Office for the Prefecture of Shkodër.
Qemal Stafa studied in Shkodër at the Saverian College. With the educational reforms established by the Minister Mirash Ivanaj, private schools were closed and Stafa moved to the public high school of Shkodër. After the death of his father in 1936, his family moved to Tirana, where he studied at the Tirana Lyceum (subsequently named Qemal Stafa High School). He was one of the co-founders of the Communist Group of Shkodër, one out of three groups that would join in 1941 to form the Communist Party of Albania. In February 1939, a special court sat in Tirana against 73 people suspected for performing communist activities and propaganda. Among others there were, Tuk Jakova, Vasil Shanto, Vojo Kushi, Branko Kadia, Zef Mala, Emin Duraku and the young Stafa who was arrested on 24 January. He was sentenced to three years due to his age, while he accepted all accusations. With the turmoils of the Italian invasion of Albania of 7 April 1939, he was released from jail. Stafa wrote on the local newspaper Fashizmi (Fascism) controlled by the Albanian Fascist Party, and spend some time in Rome as a student together with his fiancé Drita Kosturi, on a scholarship from the Albanian government.

Stafa was one of the founding members of the Albanian Communist Party in Tirana on 8 November 1941. He was killed in a house on the outskirts of Tirana by the Italian fascist forces, who had occupied Albania. The 5 May, the anniversary of his death, was chosen after the end of the war as the Martyrs' Day of Albania to commemorate all those who gave their lives for Albania's liberation.

Many streets, squares and schools in different cities bear his name as well as a military base, Albania's former national stadium and the Main Stand in the current national stadium, Arena Kombëtare. Although he was glorified in the People's Socialist Republic of Albania, his fiancée and his brothers and sisters families were imprisoned and persecuted by the same administration, a fact not known by most Albanians.

References

1920 births
1942 deaths
Albanian communists
Heroes of Albania
People from Elbasan
Qemal Stafa High School alumni
Albanian resistance members